William Hunter (28 July 1887 – 24 March 1949) was an English footballer. His regular position was as a forward. He was born in Sunderland. He played for Manchester United, Sunderland West End, Liverpool, Sunderland, Lincoln City, Wingate Albion, South Shields, Barnsley, Clapton Orient and Exeter City.

References

External links
MUFCInfo.com profile
Bill Hunter, LFCHistory profile

1887 births
1949 deaths
Footballers from Sunderland
English footballers
Manchester United F.C. players
Liverpool F.C. players
Lincoln City F.C. players
Exeter City F.C. players 
Sunderland A.F.C. players
Barnsley F.C. players
Leyton Orient F.C. players
Year of death missing
Association football forwards
Southern Football League players
English Football League players